4th Infantry Brigade and Headquarters North East, previously known as 4th Mechanized Brigade and before that 4th Armoured Brigade is a brigade formation of the British Army, currently based in Catterick, North Yorkshire as part of 1st (United Kingdom) Division. The brigade, now known as the 'Black Rats', was formed in 1939 and fought in the Second World War in the Western Desert Campaign in North Africa. The Black Rats were subsequently involved in the invasion of Sicily and fighting in Italy before taking part in the Battle of Normandy and the advance through Belgium, Holland and into Germany.

More recently, the Brigade took part in the First Gulf War and completed a number of tours to the Balkans during the 1990s. The Black Rats have also since deployed twice to Iraq and twice to Afghanistan as the lead formation.

History

Second World War

In September 1939, at the start of the Second World War this brigade changed its title from Heavy Armoured Brigade (Egypt) to 4th Armoured Brigade.

On 27 July 1941, it handed over its units to the 1st Army Tank Brigade and received new units based in Egypt. It was reformed again when the HQ arrived in Sicily and it took control of new units there. The 4th Armoured Brigade saw service in the North African Campaign, the Allied invasion of Sicily, the Italian Campaign and in North-western Europe. Although it served under many different formations it was most famous as part of the 7th Armoured Division, the "Desert Rats".

The 4th Armoured Brigade left the 7th Armoured Division in North Africa in 1943, to return to join the Allied invasion force for Normandy. In June 1944, the brigade landed in Normandy as an independent brigade and fought during the Battle of Normandy during the Battle for Caen.

The 4th Armoured Brigade was the first to cross the Rhine into Germany.

The brigade was disestablished in 1948. 

Former BBC motorsports commentator Murray Walker served with 4th Armoured Brigade during the Second World War as a member of The Royal Scots Greys. After the war he started a motorcycle club, organising trials and scrambles for the soldiers within the Brigade.

Cold War era
The Brigade spent many years in Germany as part of the British Army of the Rhine. The brigade was one of two "square" brigades assigned to 2nd Armoured Division when it was formed in 1976. After being briefly converted to "Task Force Charlie" in the late 1970s, the brigade was reinstated in 1981, assigned to 3rd Armoured Division and was based at York Barracks in Münster. The Brigade deployed to the First Gulf War on Operation Granby in 1990/91 and was involved in the liberation of Kuwait.  It moved to Quebec Barracks at Osnabrück in 1993 to replace 12th Armoured Brigade as part of 1st (UK) Armoured Division.

Post-Cold War
4th Armoured Brigade deployed to Bosnia in October 1995 as UNPROFOR HQ Sector South-West and subsequently as the leading UK element of the NATO Implementation Force (IFOR). The Black Rats have since deployed twice to Iraq and twice to Afghanistan, first on Operation Herrick 12 in 2010; and again in October 2012 for Operation Herrick 17, during which it was working in support of the Afghan Army's 3/215 Brigade and elements of the Afghan National Police.

Structure circa 2020

4th Infantry Brigade 
Under Army 2020, the brigade lost its armour and converted to an infantry brigade.  The structure of the brigade in 2020 was as follows:
 4th Infantry Brigade, at Peronne Lines, Catterick Garrison
 The Light Dragoons, at Gaza Barracks, Catterick Garrison (Light Cavalry, 66x Jackal armoured reconnaissance vehicles)
 The Queen's Own Yeomanry (Army Reserve), at Fenham Barracks, Newcastle upon Tyne (Light Cavalry, 66x Jackal armoured reconnaissance vehicles)
 The Royal Highland Fusiliers, 2nd Battalion, The Royal Regiment of Scotland, at Glencorse Barracks, Penicuik (Light Infantry)
 1st Battalion, The Duke of Lancaster's Regiment, at Dale Barracks, Chester (Light Infantry)
 2nd Battalion, Mercian Regiment, at Weeton Barracks, Blackpool (Light Infantry) – arriving back from Cyprus in November 2020
 1st Battalion, Grenadier Guards, at Lille Barracks, Aldershot Garrison (Light Infantry)
 52nd Lowland Volunteers, 6th Battalion, The Royal Regiment of Scotland (Army Reserve), at Walcheren Barracks, Glasgow (Light Infantry) – paired with 2nd Battalion, Royal Regiment of Scotland (2 SCOTS)
 4th Battalion, The Duke of Lancaster's Regiment (Army Reserve), at Kimberley Barracks, Preston (Light Infantry) – paired with 1st Battalion, Duke of Lancaster's Regiment (1 LANCS)
 4th Battalion, Yorkshire Regiment (Army Reserve), at Worsley Barracks, York (Light Infantry) – paired with 2 YORKS until November, then paired with 2nd Battalion, Mercian Regiment (2 MERCIAN)

Headquarters North East 
 Headquarters North East, at Peronne Lines, Catterick Garrison
 Yorkshire Officer Training Regiment (Army Reserve)
 Leeds University Officers' Training Corps (Army Reserve), at Carlton Barracks, Leeds
 Sheffield University Officers' Training Corps (Army Reserve), at Somme Barracks, Sheffield
 Northumbrian University Officers' Training Corps (Army Reserve), in Newcastle upon Tyne
 4th Infantry Brigade & Headquarters North East Cadet Training Team, at Queen Elizabeth Barracks, Strensall
 Cleveland Army Cadet Force, in Middlesbrough
 Durham Army Cadet Force, in Chester-le-Street
 Humberside and South Yorkshire Army Cadet Force, at Driffield Camp, Driffield
 Northumbria Army Cadet Force, at Fox Barracks, Cramlington
 Yorkshire (North and West) Army Cadet Force, at Queen Elizabeth Barracks, Strensall

Second World War commanders
During the Second World War:
 January 1940 to April 1941 Brigadier J.A.L. Caunter
 April 1941 to April 1942 Brigadier A.H. Gatehouse
 April 1942 to July 1942 Brigadier G.W. Richards
 July 1942 to September 1942 Brigadier W.G. Carr
 September 1942 to November 1942 Brigadier M.G. Roddick
 November 1942 to January 1943 Brigadier C.B.C. Harvey
 January 1943 to February 1943 Brigadier D.S. Newton-King
 February 1943 to December 1943 Brigadier J.C. Currie
 December 1943 to March 1944 Brigadier H. J. B. Cracroft
 March 1944 to June 1944 Brigadier J. C. Currie
 June 1944 to August 1945 Brigadier R.M.P. Carver

Brigade commanders
Recent commanders have included:
 1976–1978 Brigadier Desmond Langley
 1981–1984 Brigadier Charles Guthrie
 1994–1996 Brigadier Richard Dannatt
 1996–1998 Brigadier David Richards
 1998–2000 Brigadier Bill Rollo
 2000-2002 Brigadier Nicholas Smith
 2002–2004 Brigadier Paul Gibson
 2005–2007 Brigadier Chris Deverell
 2007–2009 Brigadier Julian Free
 2009–2011 Brigadier Richard Felton
 2011–2013 Brigadier Bob Bruce
 2013–2015 Brigadier Charlie Herbert
 2015–2016 Brigadier Gerald Strickland
 2016–2019 Brigadier Oliver Stokes
 2019–present Brigadier Oliver Brown

See also
 4th Infantry Brigade (United Kingdom)

 British Armoured formations of World War II
 List of British brigades of the Second World War

Notes

References

Further reading
 RMP Carter (1945). The History of the 4th Armoured Brigade. .

External links

 4th Infantry Brigade
 Desert Rats Association - Brigade History
 British Army Locations from 1945

4 Armoured
4 Mechanised
Military units and formations established in 1939
Organisations based in North Yorkshire
Military units and formations established in 1976